In mathematics, a function  is symmetrically continuous at a point x if

The usual definition of continuity implies symmetric continuity, but the converse is not true.

Also, symmetric differentiability implies symmetric continuity, but the converse is not true just like usual continuity does not imply differentiability.

References 
 

Differential calculus
Theory of continuous functions
Types of functions